The Yeghegnadzor Regional Museum, is a museum in Yeghegnadzor, in the province (marz) of Vayots Dzor in southern Armenia.. It was established in 1968, and holds approximately 9000 archaeological and ethnological artefacts dating from pre-historic times to the twentieth century.

Collection 

The museum contains approximately 9000 objects, ranging in date from pre-historic times to the twentieth century. They include jewellery, tools, utensils, carpets and coins. The most significant is an intricately-carved fourteenth-century khachkar carved by Momik, originally in the monastery of Noravank; it is two parts, which were found in different places.

References 

Museums in Armenia
Museums established in 1968
1968 establishments in Armenia
Tourist attractions in Vayots Dzor Province
Buildings and structures in Vayots Dzor Province